Holly Ransom (born 7 February 1990) is a public speaker, author and content curator. She is the founder of Emergent, a leadership consultancy, where she engages and presents to organizations on disruptive strategy. She is also a director of Port Adelaide Football Club and a trustee of The Prince's Charities Australia.

Career 
In 2012 Westpac and Australian Financial Review named her one of Australia's 100 Women of Influence. She was co-chair of the 2014 Y20 Youth Summit.

Ransom became the youngest board member in Port Adelaide history, when her appointment was announced in 2016.

In 2017, she was Sir Richard Branson's nominee for Wired's 'Smart List' of 'future game changers to watch'.

Ransom has appeared as a regular panelist on the ABC programs Q&A and The Drum. In 2018, she interviewed former US president Barack Obama. In 2019, she was awarded the Anne Wexler Fulbright Scholarship.
In recognition of her contribution to community, the US Embassy awarded her the 2019 Eleanor Roosevelt Leadership Award, while Women & Leadership Australia named her the winner of the 2019 Victorian Excellence in Women's Leadership Award.

Ransom's first book The Leading Edge was published by Penguin on July 20, 2021. She also serves as Pride Cup chair, and was a member on the steering committee for Port Adelaide's AFLW team, scheduled to make its competitive debut in late 2022.

References

1990 births
Living people
People from Perth, Western Australia
Australian women in business
Women business executives
Australian writers
21st-century women
University of Western Australia alumni
Harvard Kennedy School alumni